Social Service Building is a historic office building located in the Washington Square West neighborhood of Philadelphia, Pennsylvania. It was designed by noted Philadelphia architect Horace Trumbauer (1868-1938) and built in 1923–1924.  It is a 10-story, steel frame brick clad building with limestone and terra cotta ornament in a Federal Revival style. The main entrance features an oversized door with fanlight, framed by Ionic order columns.

It was added to the National Register of Historic Places in 2002.

References

Government buildings on the National Register of Historic Places in Philadelphia
Federal architecture in Pennsylvania
Government buildings completed in 1924
Washington Square West, Philadelphia